is a Japanese footballer currently playing as a midfielder for Azul Claro Numazu of J3 League.

Career statistics

Club
.

Notes

References

External links

1996 births
Living people
Association football people from Osaka Prefecture
Momoyama Gakuin University alumni
Japanese footballers
Japanese expatriate footballers
Association football midfielders
J3 League players
Azul Claro Numazu players
Japanese expatriate sportspeople in Singapore
Expatriate footballers in Singapore